The Buyruks are a collection of spiritual books providing the basis of the Alevi value system. The word buyruk in Turkish means "command". Topics addressed in the Buyruks include müsahiplik "spiritual brotherhood" and a wide range of Alevi stories and poems. The story of Haji Bektash Veli is found in them.

The Buyruks also contain Quranic verses, the sayings of Ali and  the Twelve Imams, as well as sayings and songs written by Yunus Emre, Pir Abdal Musa, Pir Sultan Abdal, and Ismail I, known by his pen name, Khata'i.

Authority
The "Buyruks" include pillars which dedes must uphold and Alevis must also generally adhere to the rules put forth in them.

References

External links
 Alevi.org

Alevism
Religious texts